The Agreement on Government Procurement (GPA) is a plurilateral agreement under the auspices of the World Trade Organization (WTO) which regulates the procurement of goods and services by the public authorities of the parties to the agreement, based on the principles of openness, transparency and non-discrimination.

The agreement was originally established in 1979 as the Tokyo Round Code on Government Procurement, which entered into force in 1981 under the auspices of the General Agreement on Tariffs and Trade. It was then renegotiated in parallel with the Uruguay Round in 1994, and this version entered into force on 1 January 1996. The agreement was subsequently revised on 30 March 2012. The revised GPA came into effect on 6 July 2014 and applies since 1 January 2021 to all members.

Parties
The following WTO Members are parties to the amended 1994 agreement: 

Notes

Observer status
The following WTO Members have obtained observer status with respect to the GPA, with those marked with an asterisk (*) negotiating accession: Afghanistan, Albania*, Argentina, Bahrain, Belarus, Brazil*, Cameroon, Chile, China*, Colombia, Costa Rica, Côte d'Ivoire, Ecuador, Georgia*, India, Indonesia, Jordan*, Kazakhstan*, Kyrgyz Republic*, North Macedonia*, Malaysia, Mongolia, Oman*, Pakistan, Panama, Paraguay, Philippines, Russia*, Saudi Arabia, Seychelles, Sri Lanka, Tajikistan*, Thailand, Turkey and Vietnam.

Review Body on Bid Challenges 
The Review Body on Bid Challenges is a body set up by party states in order to allow suppliers to challenge irregular government tenders. The Review Body is independent and endeavors to process each case in an expeditious manner. The Review Body is also empowered to recommend Rapid Interim Measures (RIMs), which can be recommended within days where a Review Body finds a prima facie case for a bid challenge.

UK membership after Brexit
The UK applied the agreement as part of its EU membership from 1 January 1996. After it left on 1 February 2020, the agreement remained in force during the transition period until 1 January 2021. Discussions about continued UK membership were initiated on 27 June 2018, and in October 2020, the UK was invited to become a party in its own right at the end of the transition phase.

References

External links 
 The plurilateral Agreement on Government Procurement (GPA) (WTO)
integrated Government Procurement Market Access Information Portal (e-GPA), a single point of access to market access information, provided by the WTO

World Trade Organization agreements
Agreement on Government Procurement
Treaties concluded in 1994
Treaties concluded in 1979
Treaties entered into force in 1981
Treaties entered into force in 1996
Government procurement
Treaties of Armenia
Treaties of Australia
Treaties of Canada
Treaties entered into by the European Union
Treaties of Hong Kong
Treaties of Iceland
Treaties of Israel
Treaties of Japan
Treaties of South Korea
Treaties of Liechtenstein
Treaties of Moldova
Treaties of Montenegro
Treaties of Norway
Treaties of Singapore
Treaties of Switzerland
Treaties of Taiwan
Treaties of Ukraine
Treaties of the United States
Treaties of the United Kingdom
Treaties extended to Aruba